Saber Kazemi (born December 24, 1998, in Gorgan) is an Iranian volleyball player who plays as an opposite spiker for the Iranian national team and Iranian club Shahrdari Urmia.

Kazemi was invited to Iran senior national team by Igor Kolaković in 2018 and made his debut match against Italy in the 2018 Nations League.

Honours

National team
Asian Championship
Gold medal (1): 2021
Asian Games
Gold medal (1): 2018

Club
Asian Championship
Gold medal (1): 2021 (Foolad Sirjan Iranian)
Iranian Super League
Champions (1): 2021 (Foolad Sirjan)

Individual
Most Valuable Player: 2021 Asian Championship
Most Valuable Player: 2021 Asian Club Championship

References

External links
 

1998 births
Living people
Iranian men's volleyball players
People from Gorgan
Iranian expatriate sportspeople in Turkey
Asian Games medalists in volleyball
Volleyball players at the 2018 Asian Games
Medalists at the 2018 Asian Games
Asian Games gold medalists for Iran
Olympic volleyball players of Iran
Volleyball players at the 2020 Summer Olympics
Opposite hitters
21st-century Iranian people